The 1965 World Fencing Championships were held in Paris, France.

Medal table

Medal summary

Men's events

Women's events

References

FIE Results

World Fencing Championships
1965 in French sport
1965 in Paris
Fencing
International fencing competitions hosted by France
1965 in fencing